Homo mermanus is a fictional race of gilled aquatic humanoids appearing in American comic books published by Marvel Comics. This race is best known as the inhabitants of Atlantis in the Marvel Universe. Namor the Sub-Mariner is the most notable character and representative of the race. Bill Everett often called them submariners and Prince Namor, the Sub-Mariner, but Stan Lee began to call everyone Atlanteans and the undersea kingdom Atlantis.

An offshoot of the Homo sapiens species with an as-yet undisclosed origin, Homo mermanus is a mammalian species but with some fish-like characteristics. Each one possesses two twin gills located on their necks near the clavicle bone, which allow them to breathe underwater. Their skin pigmentation can be either blue (for most Atlanteans) or green (for most Lemurians and nomads).

Their physiology is also much stronger and more durable than that of the Homo sapiens, created by their evolution under extreme water pressure of over 101 atm over countless years. As a consequence, they are physically much stronger than regular humans and can swim up to 30 miles (48 km) per hour (about 16x faster than the average Homo sapiens). The typical lifespan for a Homo mermanus is 150 years. However, they cannot survive outside of water for longer than five minutes without aid due to their species staying in deep water with no human contact.

Publication history

Atlanteans first appeared in Motion Picture Funnies Weekly #1 (April 1939).

Fictional race history
Homo mermanus are often referred to as Atlanteans because it was in the city of Atlantis that their first complex society emerged. Like humans, they learned to domesticate animals, such as dolphins.

Atlantis itself had been a small above ground continent with many human settlements, when an event 10,000 years ago called the "Great Cataclysm" caused it to be submerged into the sea. 2,000 years later, a group of Homo mermanus made the ruins of the human settlements in Atlantis their home and went on to develop a society there, using as much of the material as they could scavenge from the wreckage. Many of the warring tribes united under a single emperor (although by the 20th century there were still some barbarian tribes).

500 years after the settlement of Atlantis, another group of Homo mermanus left Atlantis to found their own city-this time in a part of the ruins of another continent submerged during the Great Cataclysm-Lemuria in the Pacific Ocean.

These "Lemurians" would discover the Serpent Crown in the ruins of their city, and through their Leader Naga's exposure and extensive use of the ancient mystical device, they would become more serpent-like in appearance than their Atlantean cousins.

Many Atlanteans worship Neptune, Roman god of the sea.

During the 20th century the Homo mermanus race began to come into sustained contact with their human cousins. These contacts have often been hostile, and have included many aborted invasions (Atlantis Attacks etc.) and even separate occasions when large numbers of Homo mermanus were rendered comatose or sterilized for periods. During the Second World War the kingdom of Atlantis also fought against the Axis Powers in alliance with the Allied Powers.

However, not all interactions between Homo sapiens and Homo mermanus have been hostile - during the 1920s a Homo mermanus female, Princess Fen of Atlantis mated with the human sea captain Leonard McKenzie - a union which produced the first human/Atlantean hybrid - Namor {avenging son in atlantean}, the Sub-Mariner.

In the aftermath of the Civil War and the World War Hulk events the homo mermanus, being blamed for the terrorism due to the actions of Kamar, militaristic son of Namor, are forced to leave the seas, using the established sleeper cells to live within humanity. The Atlantean Army resided in Latveria, guests of Doctor Doom, and the civilians lived alongside the rest of humanity.

After their leader Namor allied with the X-Men, the Atlanteans began to build a support pillar that would keep the newly established mutant nation of Utopia (near the coast of San Francisco) from sinking. Around this pillar, called the Atlantean column, they established a city called New Atlantis.

As part of the "All-New, All-Different Marvel," Atlantis was later attacked by the Squadron Supreme in retaliation for Namor and the Cabal having destroyed the worlds of some of its members. After Hyperion beheaded Namor and Power Princess killed Attuma, the Squadron Supreme recalled the information of Atlantis' previous attacks on the surface world. Hyperion then lifted Atlantis above the ocean and then threw it onto the ground enough to kill the other Atlanteans present.

Namor then begins to work to unite the different branches of Atlanteans when it comes to keeping the oceans safe from surface world invaders.

After his failure to get the Vodani on his side, Namor turned his attention towards the Sea Blades faction. Having siphoned the aquakinetic abilities of Hydro-Man, Namor parted the oceans and leaving the Sea Blades and their leader to asphyxiate unless they ceded leadership to him. Their leader Karris agreed to the terms upon being awestruck with Namor's ability.

Subraces and branches
Homo mermanus is divided between the Atlanteans and the splinter group that settled on the sunken continent of Lemuria and took the name of Lemurians. They differed in that they possessed a more reptilian greenish skin color compared to the blue-skinned Atlanteans.

The Vodani are a branch of the Atlanteans that have followed a portal in the Mindanao Trench that took them to a watery planet that they named Vodan.

The Sea Blades are a militaristic branch of shock-troopers that defected from Atlantis years ago.

Known Homo mermanus

Known Atlanteans
Listed below are the known Atlanteans, sorted by those who appear in the Golden Age, those who appear in the Modern age, and those that appeared in other time periods.

11th-century Atlanteans
 Iron Fist - An unnamed Atlantean princess that wielded the Iron Fist.

Golden Age Atlanteans
 Namor McKenzie - Ruler of Atlantis; member of the Invaders, Defenders, Avengers; retained his mutant powers after M-Day
 Blabek
 Byrrah - Cousin of Namor and Challenger of the Throne; currently deceased
 Chemil - Wartime Nurse
 Cogolla
 Daka - Uncle of Namor and possibly the Father of Byrrah; briefly took over the crown of Atlantis before Pearl Harbor; later allied with the Nazis and the Seal People and led an invasion of Argentina
 Daro
 Dorma - Wife of Namor; currently deceased
 Ertve - Wartime High Priest and member of the Council of Three.
 Fen - Mother of Namor; currently deceased ...Appears in Sub-Mariner segment of Marvel Super Heroes TV show (1966).
 Folma - Wartime Lieutenant
 Harla
 Jadda
 Kalo
 Kamara
 Karal - Royal Guard
 Lerza
 Lucas
 Mara
 Mel
 Mephistios
 Naka
 Namora (Aquaria Nautica Neptunia) - Cousin of Namor
 Narvick - Member of the Atlantean High Council
 Nostromas - Wartime Physician
 Petrod - Wartime Sentry
 Rad
 Rathia
 Sarna
 Sigor
 Tarna
 Tarot
 Thakorr - Grandfather of Namor; currently deceased ...Thakorr appears in Sub-Mariner segment of Marvel Super Heroes TV show (1966).
 Til
 Tor
 Toro - Atlantean Tailor
 Zarot
 Zolma

Modern Age characters
 Abira
 Achak
 Amir - Member of the Royal Guard, Sleeper Agent; currently deceased
 Amo
 Andromeda Attumasen - former member of the Dragon Circle and the Defenders.
 Aradnea
 Arath - Mutant Terrorist and Member of Sleeper Cell 13
 Argos - Military Officer
 Arkus - Military Officer
 Arno
 Ashur
 Askid
 Attuma - Barbarian Warlord and Usurper
 Attumacht
 Azir
 Azor
 Balaal
 Banara
 Beemer
 Betty
 Bloodtide - member of Fathom Five
 Bobo - Cousin of Namor
 Brodar
 Burka
 Byrrahna
 Chelwid
 Cirin
 Corak
 Coral - currently deceased
 Crab - Member of School
 Crosta - Mutant
 Dakkor
 Dara - Cousin of Namor, currently deceased
 Dashak
 Deathcharge
 Delta Nine - Atlantean Clone
 Dorma Clones - Atlantean Clones of the Lady Dorma
 Dorma (Heroes Reborn) - Heroes Reborn version of Dorma
 Dragonrider - Outlaw; member of Fathom Five
 Eel - Mutant; Leader of SURF
 Elanna
 Epititus - currently deceased
 Fara - currently deceased
 Farax
 Gelva
 Gorgul
 Gort
 Govan - Ambassador of Atlantis
 Grokko
 Harran
 Hana
 Husam
 Husni
 Ikthon - Head Scientist
 Immanu
 Jakka - currently deceased
 Janus - Sleeper Agent
 Jian
 Joe Atlantis
 Kadar - currently deceased
 Kalen
 Kamar - son of Namor; former member of 13th Cell; currently deceased
 Kamuu
 Kasim
 Kavor
 Keerg - Warlord
 Kida
 Kitano
 Kor-Konn
 Kormok - High Priest
 Korra - Grandmother of Namor; presumed deceased
 Korro
 Krakos
 Krang - Exiled Warlord, Former Member of the Serpent Squad
 Kurod Ormaon - (aka Bernard Waterman)
 Kyral - Geneticist
 Lida
 Lorvex
 Mad Twins
 Madoxx - Elder Statesman; Member of the Council of Three
 Mako - Genetic Creation of Vyrra; presumed deceased
 Mako
 Mako - Test Tube Atlantean; member of Young Masters
 Manowar - Mutated Warrior; member of Fathom Five
 Mara
 Marcan
 Mato
 Minnow - Member of School
 Morcan - Criminal
 Morel
 Mussels - Member of School
 Namita
 Namorita Prentiss - clone of Namora; former member of the New Warriors; killed by Nitro
 Nara
 Nautak - currently deceased
 Nereus
 Nia Noble - Half-Atlantean; Queen of Neptunia
 Numara D'athahr
 Opistho
 Orelem
 Orka - Mutated Warrior; Former Member of Heroes for Hire
 Orthus - An Atlantean in the "Heroes Reborn" pocket dimension.
 Orrek
 Ossem
 Oudvrou
 People of the Black Sea
 Politus
 Porphyr
 Proctidae
 Proteus
 Proteus - Rebel Shapeshifter
 Raman - Gate-Keeper of Atlantis
 Ramin
 Ramon
 Relun
 Remora
 Rennar
 Ronga
 Ruthar
 Saru-San - presumed deceased
 Seahorse - Member of School
 Seaweed - Member of School
 Selach - Subcommander to Krang
 Serestus
 Seth - Cousin of Namor
 Shakkoth - High Priest and member of Council of Three and At'La'Tique
 Shalak
 Sharkskin - Mutant; Member of SURF
 Shem
 Squid - Leader of the School
 Stegor
 Sulumor - Delegate to Mazikhandar; currently deceased
 Talan
 Tanas
 Tareva - Sorceress
 Teneel
 Thakos - Warlord and member of the Council of Three
 Thallo
 Timoran
 Tornaga
 Trident Team
 Tulem
 Tyrak - Size-shifting Atlantean
 U-Man (Meranno) - Nazi Sympathizer
 Undertow - Mutant; Member of SURF
 Unforgiven Dead/Old Ones
 Vashti Cleito-Son - Grand Vizier and Member of Council of Three
 Vayos
 Volpan - Technician
 Vyrra - Outlaw Geneticist; currently deceased
 Watersnake (Faira Sar Namora)
 Waya
 Whalesong
 Worta
 Wurta
 Xiomara
 Yorlo
 Zantor
 Zantor - Scientist
 Zarina - Aunt of Namor
 Zartra
 Zoga - Mutated Rebel; currently deceased
 Zoran

Known Lemurians
Listed below are the known Lemurians:

 Karthon
 Merro
 Naga
 Nagala
 Llyna
 Llyra - Half-Lemurian
 Llyron
 Llyron - Pseudo-Clone of Namor; member of Fathom Five

Known Vodani
 Kataw - The Princess of the Vodani who helped Namor fight the Skrilkrak. She becomes Queen after the death of King Okun.
 Okun - The King of the Vodani. He was killed by Namor when he tried to kill him at the Canyon of Sorrow.

Known Sea Blades
 Karris - The admiral of the Sea Blades.

In other media

Television
 The Atlanteans appear in the Sub-Mariner segment of The Marvel Super Heroes. Besides Namor, the featured Atlanteans are Lady Dorma, Warlord Krang, and Attuma.
 The Atlanteans appear in the Fantastic Four episode "Now Comes the Sub-Mariner". Namor, Lady Dorma, and Warlord Krang are featured in this episode.
 The Atlanteans appear in The Avengers: United They Stand episode "To Rule Atlantis". While Namor and Attuma are featured, the episode includes Pecos and Dara who are exclusive to this TV series.
 The Atlanteans appear in the Fantastic Four episode "Imperious Rex". Namor planned to lead the Atlanteans into invading the surface world. In the episode "Atlantis Attacks", the Fantastic Four team up with Namor when Attuma attacks Atlantis.
 The Atlanteans appear in Avengers Assemble. Known Atlanteans include Attuma, Orka, a variation of Lady Zartra (voiced by April Stewart), and Attuma's daughter Elanna (voiced by Ashley Eckstein). In the episode "Depth Charge", Attuma leads his Atlantean soldiers in attacking Manhattan and trying to sink it. In "Beneath the Surface", it is revealed that Attuma's chief adviser Lady Zartra and those with her have gotten tired of Attuma's tyranny and planned to use the Serpent Crown to control Giganto into helping them fight against Attuma's army. Following a misunderstanding between Lady Zartra's group and the Avengers, both groups work together to fight Attuma's army when he obtains the Serpent Crown and controls Giganto. After Attuma is defeated, the Atlanteans on Lady Zartra's side gain the trust in the Avengers. In the episode "Avengers Underground", some of the Atlanteans on Attuma's side arrived in Manhattan only to encounter Hyperion. The Atlantean soldiers present were annihilated by Hyperion after he threw one of them back into the ocean to inform Attuma what he just saw and that Earth is under the Squadron Supreme's rule. In the two-part episode "Shadow of Atlantis", Attuma and Atlantis are mentioned to have signed a peace treaty with the surface world. However, Attuma's former general Tiger Shark leads the Atlanteans on his side to target the Wakandan embassy. When Tiger Shark is defeated, Attuma shows up with his men to arrest Tiger Shark. In the episode "Into the Deep", it was revealed that N'Jadaka was the ambassador to Atlantis up to his plot to secretly destroy Atlantis with his bombs. After the bomb plot was thwarted, Killmonger and Tiger Shark got away. In the two-part episode "Kingbreaker", Attuma has appointed Commander Orka to replace Tiger Shark as the head of Attuma's armed forces while his daughter Elanna improved the security measures. Princess Zanda plots to bomb Atlantis while rigging Tony Stark's armor in the form of Black Widow in order to kill Attuma. After the bomb is disposed by White Wolf, Attuma works with Black Panther to save the Atlanteans and fix the cracks that the bomb left. By the time Black Panther and Attuma settle their differences, Attuma is fatally attacked by Killmonger using Attuma's trident and dies in Elanna's arms. Black Panther and White Wolf couldn't give a defeated Killmonger to Elanna because of his intel on where the real Black Widow is as the two of them take Killmonger as their prisoner. Elanna's first act as queen is that she released Tiger Shark to assist in her upcoming war with Wakanda.

Film
In the 2022 film Black Panther: Wakanda Forever, the race and city was changed to Talokanil and Talokan  instead of Atlanteans and Atlantis.

Video games
The Atlanteans appear in Marvel: Ultimate Alliance. The game features a stage where the players must travel to the underwater city of Atlantis to stop a riot orchestrated by Attuma, who believes he will become the sea kingdoms' new ruler as foretold in the Atlantean Chronicles. Attuma uses sonic emmiters to cause the Atlanteans to riot and turn against Namor. Attuma is assisted in his goal by Byrrah, Tiger Shark, and Warlord Krang. When Attuma and Tiger Shark are defeated, Tiger Shark mentions that Doctor Doom was their benefactor in Attuma's plot. Within the game, there is also a temple devoted to Negrete, whose shrine is protected by temple guardians trained to defeat any trespassers. The Eyes of Negrete are holy objects used by the temple priests for access to the inner sanctums of the temple. In the Atlantis briefing, Captain America mentions that the Atlanteans dislike surface dwellers.

References

 Gruenwald, Mark & Sanderson, Peter (1985). Atlanteans. In Official Handbook of the Marvel Universe: Deluxe Edition #1: Abomination - Batroc's Brigade pp. 38–39. New York: Marvel Comics.
 Gruenwald, Mark & Sanderson, Peter (1985). Atlantis. In Official Handbook of the Marvel Universe: Deluxe Edition #1: Abomination- Batroc's Brigade pp. 40–41. New York: Marvel Comics.

External links
 Atlanteans at Marvel.com
 http://www.marvel.com/universe/Glossary:H#Homo_mermanus

Timely Comics characters
Fictional Atlanteans